Ubaldo Jiménez García (born January 22, 1984) is a Dominican-American former professional baseball pitcher. He played in Major League Baseball (MLB) for the Colorado Rockies, Cleveland Indians and Baltimore Orioles. Jiménez was an MLB All-Star in 2010. That year, he pitched the first no-hitter in Rockies' franchise history.

Jimenez earned his 100th MLB career victory on September 22, 2015 as a member of the Baltimore Orioles, while pitching against the Washington Nationals. In 2016, he became an American citizen.

Early life
Jiménez was born and raised in the Dominican Republic. His father, Ubaldo, served in the Dominican Army and the family never had enough money to buy a house. At 16 years old, he was offered a contract by the New York Mets but his mother said that he could not sign because he needed to finish high school. He signed with the Colorado Rockies on April 25, 2001 for $50,000 in part because they allowed him to skip training to finish high school.

Career

Colorado Rockies

2006–2008
Jiménez made his MLB debut on September 26, 2006. He came in as a relief pitcher for the Colorado Rockies during the eighth inning of an 11–4 home loss to the Los Angeles Dodgers. He allowed two hits and no runs. He would make his first MLB start on October 1 against the Chicago Cubs on the road, which was the last game of the regular season. Jiménez allowed three hits and three earned runs over a span of  innings in an 8–5 loss. He didn't receive a decision for the game.

Jiménez earned his first MLB win on July 29, 2007 at home against the Los Angeles Dodgers. He pitched six innings, giving up four hits and two earned runs. The Rockies won the game, 9–6. On September 5, he gained the distinction of giving up Barry Bonds's 762nd and final career home run. Jiménez made his Major League Baseball postseason debut on October 6 during Game 3 of the 2007 National League Division Series in Colorado against the Philadelphia Phillies. He started the game and pitched six innings, allowing three hits and one earned run, as part of a 2–1 victory (the win gave the Rockies a series sweep over the Phillies). However, Jiménez didn't receive a decision for the game. He started his second consecutive game of the postseason on October 12, which was Game 2 of the 2007 National League Championship Series against the Arizona Diamondbacks on the road. He pitched five innings, giving up one hit and one earned run. The Rockies would eventually win the game, 3–2, but Jiménez received his second straight postseason no-decision. Colorado swept Arizona and faced the Boston Red Sox in the 2007 World Series. Jiménez started Game 2, suffering a 2–1 loss in Boston. He allowed three hits and two earned runs in  innings. Boston went on to sweep Colorado.

In 2008, Jiménez went 12–12 with a 3.99 earned run average. His 34 starts led the National League. He threw the fastest fastball among starters in the Major Leagues, averaging 94.9 mph.

2009–2011
During the 2008 offseason, Jiménez signed a four-year, $10 million contract with a club option up to 2013–14. In the 2009 season, he went 15–12 with a 3.47 ERA, his second full season as a starter in the majors. Jiménez pitched at least six innings in a franchise-record 25 consecutive starts from May 1 to September 7.

Jiménez pitched for the Dominican Republic during the 2009 World Baseball Classic. On March 10, he set a single-start strikeout record, fanning 10 of the 13 batters he faced during his 65-pitch, four-inning performance in Round One against the Netherlands.

On April 17, 2010, Jiménez no-hit the Atlanta Braves 4–0 at Turner Field, the first no-hitter in the history of the franchise. He walked 6 batters, while striking out 7, and throwing a career-high 128 pitches (72 for strikes). He faced 31 batters in the game. The no-hitter was preserved by a diving catch in center field by Dexter Fowler in the bottom of the seventh inning. Jiménez's fastball reached 100 mph three times during the game, and it averaged 96.8 mph. During the no-hitter, Jiménez switched from the windup to the stretch delivery after issuing a lead-off walk in the fifth inning (his sixth total walk of the game). Following the switch, he didn't allow a walk for the remainder of the game. Jiménez also helped his own cause offensively, scoring Brad Hawpe with a fourth-inning single; he himself scored on a Carlos González double one batter later.

Jiménez was named the National League Pitcher of the Month for April, becoming the second pitcher in Rockies history to win a Pitcher of the Month award. Jiménez was only the second pitcher in MLB history to throw a no-hitter and notch five wins in the month of April. He also set a franchise record for consecutive scoreless innings for a starting pitcher (the streak was eventually snapped on May 3 after  straight scoreless innings). He broke that mark shortly thereafter, as he went 33 straight scoreless innings from May to June, which was a franchise record for not only starting pitchers, but relievers as well (Gabe White previously held the team record of 29 consecutive scoreless innings). Jiménez became the first pitcher since Jack Morris in 1986 to have two streaks of at least 25 consecutive scoreless innings in one season. He was again named National League Pitcher of the Month for May. He became the first pitcher in Rockies history to win the award more than once and the first pitcher since Pedro Martínez in 1999 to win the award in April and May.

Jiménez was the third pitcher in MLB history to win 11 out of his first 12 games and have an ERA below 1.00 (0.93). He had the lowest ERA (0.78) in MLB history through 11 starts. In his one loss, he went seven innings, giving up two hits and one earned run in a 2–0 road loss against the Los Angeles Dodgers.
On July 4, 2010, Jiménez was one of two Rockies, along with shortstop Troy Tulowitzki, selected as a National League All-Star to play in the 2010 Major League Baseball All-Star Game at Angel Stadium of Anaheim in Anaheim, California. He entered the game leading all Major League pitchers with a 15–1 record and a 2.20 ERA (as of July 8). On July 12, 2010, Jiménez was named the starting pitcher for the National League All-Star team ahead of fellow NL aces Tim Lincecum, Roy Halladay, and Adam Wainwright. In two scoreless innings he threw 25 pitches with two hits, one strikeout, one walk, and 3 baserunners. 2010 was the NL's first All-Star win since 1996 and Jiménez's first All-Star selection. Jiménez would finish the season on a rough note, going 4–7 after the All-Star break. Jiménez finished 19–8 with 214 strikeouts an ERA of 2.88 in  innings pitched for the Rockies. His 19 wins set a single-season Rockies record.

The following season, Jiménez through 21 starts was 6–9 for the Rockies, who at the time were considering trading Ubaldo.

Cleveland Indians

On July 31, 2011, Jiménez was traded to the Cleveland Indians in exchange for Alex White, Joe Gardner, Matt McBride and Drew Pomeranz. Tom Verducci wrote in Sports Illustrated shortly before the trade "Jimenez has terrific stuff, a powerful frame and the work ethic of a blast furnace" but was working an alarming number of innings in high altitude conditions and putting strain on the Rockies' ace. Jiménez would later recount the difficult days he had with the Rockies organization in a 2012 interview during spring training. "It was kind of hard being with the Rockies. I went through a lot of things people outside the organization don't know. But me and the people in the front office know."

On April 2, 2012, Jiménez was suspended five games by MLB for hitting former teammate Troy Tulowitzki with a pitch on the elbow the previous day. They walked toward each other and were separated, but no punches were thrown and no ejections were made. Jiménez was in conflict with Tulowitzki after he and former teammate Carlos González got lucrative contract extensions after the 2010 season, while Jiménez did not. He originally intended to appeal the suspension but later decided against doing so. In a start against the Toronto Blue Jays on July 14, Jiménez struggled with his command and had his shortest outing on the season, being pulled after  innings, and matched a career-high 8 earned runs. In his previous 7 games his ERA was 2.14 but after the loss, his record fell to 8–8 and ERA rose to 5.09. Jiménez finished with a career worst 17 losses while winning 9 games for the Indians. He also led the league in wild pitches with 16.

Jiménez rebounded in 2013, finishing with a record of 13–9 in 32 starts for the Indians. He also dropped his ERA to 3.30, two runs lower than the previous season.

Jiménez elected to opt out of the final year of his contract with the Indians and became a free agent on November 1, 2013.

Baltimore Orioles

2014
On February 19, 2014, Jiménez's successful 2013 season earned him a 4-year $50 million deal with the Baltimore Orioles.

In his first start with the Orioles, Jimenez threw six innings against the Red Sox, getting tagged for four runs and a loss. He would go on to lose his next three decisions, as the Orioles lost in his first five starts. He pitched to a 6.59 ERA and went 0–4 in his first month with the O's. His first win as a member of the Orioles came on May 2, when he tossed 7 scoreless innings against the Twins. On July 11, 2014, Jimenez was placed on the 15-day DL due to a right ankle sprain.

In his first season with Baltimore, Jimenez was 6–9 with a 4.81 ERA in 25 games (22 starts). He was included on the team's ALDS roster, but did not pitch in the series. Despite being on the ALDS roster, Jimenez was left off of the O's ALCS roster against the Kansas City Royals. After this failed season the Orioles President Dan Duquette refused to cut him or trade him because the team believed he could bring back that half a season of success.

2015
On April 11, 2015, in his first start of the season, Jimenez pitched 7 shutout innings, against the Toronto Blue Jays. He allowed only two base runners, a single by José Reyes in the 4th, and a walk to him in 6th, and struck out 8. On April 17, 2015, in a start against the Boston Red Sox, Jiménez was ejected for the first time in his career by home plate umpire Jordan Baker. Jiménez had hit Pablo Sandoval in the right shoulder. Baker deemed the hit by pitch intentional, after Sandoval had slid into second baseman Jonathan Schoop, to break up a double play.

After starting the first half of the season going 7–4 with a 2.81 ERA in 17 starts, Jimenez had a disappointing second half, as he pitched to a 5.63 ERA with a 5–6 record after the All-Star break. He finished the 2015 season with a moderate 4.11 ERA in 32 starts. He went 12–10 with a 1.32 WHIP and 168 strikeouts in 184 innings pitched.

2016
Heading into the 2016 season, Jimenez looked to carry on the success from the previous season but struggled mightily in the first half, registering an ERA of 7.38 through 18 appearances. On September 5, Jimenez pitched his first complete game since 2011. After allowing a 3-run home run in the first inning to the Rays, Jimenez retired 25 of the final 26 batters he faced, including the final 17 batters of the game. It was also the Orioles' first complete game since September 3, 2014. In his very next start, Jimenez lowered his ERA to below six for the first time since May 17. He pitched seven innings of 2-run ball, earning his fourth straight quality start, and fifth straight start allowing three or fewer runs. Jimenez would finish the season with an 8–12 record and an ERA of 5.44 in 29 games, 25 starts.

In the Wild Card game, Jimenez entered the game in the bottom of the 11th inning with 1 out and no one on base. He proceeded to give up 3 straight hits, the last of which was a game and season ending walk-off home run to Edwin Encarnación, ending the Orioles season.

2017

Jimenez opened the season as the Orioles' fourth starter. Throughout the whole season, Jimenez endured his career worst season, setting career highs in ERA (6.81), earned runs (108) and home runs allowed (33). The 2017 season marked Jimenez's final season in Baltimore, ending his four-year run with a record of 32-42 and an ERA of 5.22 for Baltimore.

Second stint with Colorado Rockies
On February 5, 2020, Jimenez signed a minor league deal with the Colorado Rockies and was invited to spring training. Jimenez was released by the Rockies organization on July 20, 2020.

Jimenez announced his retirement from professional baseball on September 17, 2020.

Scouting report
Jiménez's four-seam fastball was frequently clocked as high as 96 mph, although later in his career, his average four-seam fastball typically registered between 90 and 93 mph. No one threw more pitches over 95 mph (1,342) than did Jiménez during the 2008 season. In 2010, he was one of only three starting pitchers, along with Justin Verlander and Stephen Strasburg, to have pitched 20 or more pitches of over 100 mph.

Jiménez's two-seam fastball exhibited strong "tailing" action (moving inside on a right-handed batter and away from a left-handed batter), as well as good "sinking" action, though not always by design. His velocity ranged from 89 to 93 mph, though sometimes reaching 94–96 mph. In 2008, Jiménez posted a very robust ground-ball percentage of 54.4%, a testament to this pitch's effectiveness and making him an ideal pitcher for Coors Field, a ballpark known for extra-base hits.

Jiménez was known to throw a split-finger fastball and an occasional forkball, having deceptive downward movement in the 85–88 mph range.

The changeup thrown by Jiménez also exhibited strong "sinking" action, so much so that television commentators unfamiliar with Jiménez often had trouble distinguishing his change-up from a sinking fastball or a split-finger fastball. Jiménez varied the pitch by using both a circle changeup and traditional straight changeup grip. Typically thrown between 85 and 90 mph, the pitch would dive down and away from left-handed batters.

Jiménez's slider was usually thrown between 83 and 85 mph. This pitch fooled batters with an unusually sharp, late break and was used second most in frequency behind his four-seam fastball. Batters often confused this pitch with a fastball (the major league average for a fastball is approximately 91 mph) and due to the tight, late-breaking movement of the pitch, were often unable to hit it.

The final pitch in Jiménez's arsenal was a looping curveball. Used infrequently, it was thrown anywhere between 75 and 82 mph and exhibited a traditional "12–6" break.

Honors and awards
National League All-Star starting roster in the 2010 Major League Baseball All-Star Game
2× National League Pitcher of the Month (April – May 2010)
No. 24 of Baseball's Best Minor League Players – MLN FAB50 Baseball 2006.
No. 30 of Baseball's Best Minor League Players – MLN FAB50 Baseball 2005.
No. 32 of Baseball's Best Minor League Players – MLN FAB50 Baseball 2004.

See also

 List of Colorado Rockies team records
 List of Major League Baseball no-hitters

References

External links

Sky-high skills Ubaldo Jiménez earns pitching's highest rank: ace FOX Sports

1984 births
Living people
Aberdeen IronBirds players
American sportspeople of Dominican Republic descent
Asheville Tourists players
Baltimore Orioles players
Casper Rockies players
Cleveland Indians players
Colorado Rockies players
Colorado Springs Sky Sox players
Dominican Republic emigrants to the United States

Major League Baseball pitchers
Major League Baseball players from the Dominican Republic
Modesto Nuts players
National League All-Stars
Norfolk Tides players
People from Nagua
Tigres del Licey players
Tulsa Drillers players
Visalia Oaks players
World Baseball Classic players of the Dominican Republic
2009 World Baseball Classic players
Florida Institute of Technology alumni
Naturalized citizens of the United States